The 2008 Suruga Bank Championship is the inaugural match between the winners of the previous season's J. League Cup and the Copa Sudamericana. It was contested by the 2007 J. League Cup winner Japanese club Gamba Osaka and the 2007 Copa Sudamericana champion Argentine club Arsenal.

The match was won by Arsenal after a late second-half header by Carlos Casteglione off a corner kick by Javier Yacuzzi.

Summary

External links
Official page on CONMEBOL's site
Full report
All about 2008 Suruga Bank Championship

2008 in South American football
2008
2008 in Japanese football
Arsenal de Sarandí matches
Gamba Osaka matches